Edward I (died November 1336), was the Count of Bar from 1302 to his death. He was a minor when he succeeded his father Henry III as count, so ruled initially under the regency of his uncles, John of Puisaye, Theobald, Bishop of Liège, and Renaud, Bishop of Metz (his mother Eleanor had been dead since 1298).

In 1308, he accompanied Frederick IV of Lorraine into battle. In 1310, he married Mary, daughter of Robert II, Duke of Burgundy, and was declared to have attained his majority. Then he purchased the lordship of Stenay from his uncle John, the aforementioned lord of Puisaye. In 1313, he was captured in war against Frederick and not ransomed until 1314. He constructed a hydraulic forge at Moyeuvre-Grande in 1323. In 1324, he was again allied in military operations with the duke of Lorraine, and also with the King of Bohemia, John, and the Archbishop of Trier, Baldwin of Luxembourg. This operation was the War of Metz, for each of the allied lords was owed something by the citizens of Metz. Edward demanded compensation for garrisoning the city with his own troops during a conflict with the bishop of Verdun.

In 1336, Edward died in a shipwreck off the coast of Famagusta, Cyprus, while en route to a Crusade. By his wife, he left three children:

Henry IV, his successor
Eleanor (died 1332), married (1330) Rudolph, Duke of Lorraine, son of Frederick IV and Elisabeth of Austria, of the House of Habsburg
Beatrice, married Guido Gonzaga, Lord of Mantua, member of the House of Gonzaga

References

1290s births
1336 deaths
Counts of Bar
House of Montbelliard
Regents
Regents of Lorraine